The 1947 South Dakota Coyotes football team was an American football team that represented the University of South Dakota as a member of the North Central Conference (NCC) during the 1951 college football season. In their 10th season under head coach Harry Gamage, the Coyotes compiled a 7–2 record (4–0 against NCC opponents), tied for the NCC championship, and outscored opponents by a total of 164 to 152. They played their home games at Inman Field in Vermillion, South Dakota.

Schedule

References

South Dakota
South Dakota Coyotes football seasons
North Central Conference football champion seasons
South Dakota Coyotes football